List of rivers in Alagoas (Brazilian State).

The list is arranged by drainage basin from north to south, with respective tributaries indented under each larger stream's name and ordered from downstream to upstream. All rivers in Alagoas drain to the Atlantic Ocean.

By Drainage Basin 

 Uná River (Pernambuco)
 Jacuípe River
 Persinunga River
 Salgado River
 Manguaba River
 Tatuamunha River
 Camaragibe River
 Santo Antônio Grande River
 Jirituba River
 Meirim River
 Prataji River
 Mundaú River
 Satuba River
 Cutanji River
 Canhoto River
 Inhumas River
 Paraíba River
 Paraibinha River
 São Miguel River
 Jequiá River
 Coruripe River
 São Francisco River
 Marituba River
 Piauí River
 Perucaba River
 Boacica River
 Cafundó River (Itiúba River)
 Traipu River
 Ipanema River
 Jacaré River
 Capiá River
 Moxotó River

Alphabetically 

 Boacica River
 Cafundó River (Itiúba River)
 Camaragibe River
 Canhoto River
 Capiá River
 Coruripe River
 Cutanji River
 Inhumas River
 Ipanema River
 Jacaré River
 Jacuípe River
 Jequiá River
 Jirituba River
 Manguaba River
 Marituba River
 Meirim River
 Moxotó River
 Mundaú River
 Paraíba River
 Paraibinha River
 Persinuga River
 Perucaba River
 Piauí River
 Prataji River
 Salgado River
 Santo Antônio Grande River
 São Francisco River
 São Miguel River
 Satuba River
 Tatuamunha River
 Traipu River

References
 Map from Ministry of Transport
  GEOnet Names Server

 
Alagoas
Environment of Alagoas